Li Rui (born 22 November 1979) is a retired female hurdler from PR China. She won the gold medal at the 1998 Asian Championships, in a career best time of 55.80 seconds. She finished seventh at the 1998 World Cup.

Achievements

References

1979 births
Living people
Chinese female hurdlers
Athletes (track and field) at the 1998 Asian Games
Asian Games competitors for China